Eta Serpentis, Latinized from η Serpentis, is a star in the constellation Serpens. In particular, it lies in Serpens Cauda, the snake's tail. The star has an apparent visual magnitude of 3.260, making it visible to the naked eye.

This star is larger than the Sun, with twice the mass and almost six times the radius. The spectrum matches a stellar classification of K0 III-IV, with the luminosity class of III-IV corresponding to an evolved star that lies between the subgiant and giant stages. At this temperature, it has an orange hue typical of a K-type star. Eta Serpentis displays solar-like oscillations with a period of 0.09 of a day.

Eta Serpentis was previously classified as a carbon star, which would have made it the brightest carbon star in the sky, although this classification was since found to be erroneous.

Eta Serpentis is currently 1.6 light-years away from Gliese 710.

Name
The leftmost borderline of the enclosure consists of η Serpentis, δ Herculis, λ Herculis, μ Herculis, o Herculis, 112 Herculis, η Ophiuchi, ζ Aquilae, θ1 Serpentis, ν Ophiuchi and ξ Serpentis.

References 

K-type giants
Serpens (constellation)
Serpentis, Eta
Durchmusterung objects
Serpentis, 58
168723
089962
6869